Mathis Spur is a rock spur along the west side of Saratoga Table,  north of Mount Stephens, in the Forrestal Range of the Pensacola Mountains, Antarctica. It was mapped by the United States Geological Survey from surveys and U.S. Navy air photos, 1956–66, and was named by the Advisory Committee on Antarctic Names for Melvin Mathis, a hospital corpsman at Ellsworth Station, winter 1957.

References

Ridges of Queen Elizabeth Land